Sir Anthony Frank Mason    HonFAIB DistFRSN (born 21 April 1925) is an Australian judge who served as the ninth Chief Justice of Australia, in office from 1987 to 1995. He was first appointed to the High Court in 1972, having previously served on the Supreme Court of New South Wales.

Education
Raised in Sydney, Mason was a student at Sydney Grammar School. During World War II, he served in the Royal Australian Air Force, holding the rank of Flying Officer. After the war, Mason studied at the University of Sydney, graduating with the degrees of Bachelor of Arts and Bachelor of Laws. Mason articled at Clayton Utz, where he met his wife, Patricia.

Legal career

Mason was admitted to the New South Wales Bar. For five years he lectured in law at the University of Sydney, his students including three future High Court Justices, Mary Gaudron, William Gummow and Dyson Heydon. In November 1964, aged 39, Mason was announced as the new Solicitor-General of Australia, with an accompanying appointment as Queen's Counsel (QC). He was the first person to serve as solicitor-general in a standalone capacity, as the office had previously been held by the secretary of the Attorney-General's Department. In 1966 he appeared opposite future High Court colleague William Deane, successfully arguing that the Judicial Committee of the Privy Council should reject an appeal from the High Court case of R v Anderson; Ex parte IPEC-Air Pty Ltd. He served until 1969 and during this time contributed greatly to the development of the Commonwealth's administrative law system.

Judicial career
In 1969, Mason was made a judge of the Supreme Court of New South Wales, where he sat as a member of the Court of Appeal. In the same year he was appointed by the Gorton Government to a three-year term on the council of the Australian National University. He served on the Supreme Court until 1972, when he was appointed to the bench of the High Court of Australia and received a knighthood (KBE). After fifteen years on the High Court, and following the retirement of Sir Harry Gibbs, in 1987 Mason was appointed Chief Justice; he retired in 1995 on reaching the constitutionally mandatory retirement age of 70.

Mason had a significant influence over the High Court. Initially a conservative judge, his tenure as Chief Justice can be seen as the high-water mark of the movement away from the "strict legalism" which characterised the High Court under Sir Owen Dixon. Mason was more flexible in his attitude to precedent than many other judges, viewing it more as a policy for consistency than something which would strictly coerce and constrain his decisions.

During the years of the "Mason Court", a variety of important cases were decided.  These included:
Cole v Whitfield (1988): a landmark decision on the meaning of Constitution section 92.  The unanimous judgment observed (par. 7):

For the first time, the Constitution was interpreted with systematic reference to records of the constitutional conventions of the 1890s in which the text of the Constitution had been agreed (a good edition of the records had recently appeared).  The Court also examined not only the "legal" operation of a law (its effects upon legal relations) but also its "practical" operation (its "real or substantive", i.e. social or economic, effects).  However, the facts in Cole v Whitfield were relatively simple and the Court soon divided in attempts to apply the criterion of practical operation to more complex facts:  Bath v Alston Holdings (1988) and Castlemaine Tooheys v South Australia (1990).
Polyukhovich v Commonwealth (1991): Mason was in the 4:3 majority who decided, although for a variety of reasons, that retrospective war crimes legislation applying to events in Europe during World War II was a valid exercise of the external affairs power, Constitution section 51(xxix), and was consistent with the judicial power of the Commonwealth, Constitution ch III.  
Mabo v Queensland (No.2) (1992):  the colonialist doctrine of terra nullius was superseded by introducing "native title" into Australian law.  The decision provoked allegations of "judicial activism", but was soon given statutory form in the Native Title Act 1993 (Cth).
Australian Capital Television v Commonwealth (1992) and (decided on the same day) Nationwide News v Wills (1992):  an important stage in the emergence of a constitutionally implied "freedom of political communication".  The Mason Court continued this development until 1994, but it was not to receive unanimous support on the Court until after Mason's departure, in Lange v Australian Broadcasting Corporation (1997).  This freedom was considered to be implicit in Constitution sections 7 and 24, which provide that the Commonwealth Parliament shall be "directly chosen by the people".  However, the Court has remained reluctant to find further implied freedoms.  It has also continued to understand such a "freedom" as a limitation upon legislative power and not, at least directly, a personal freedom or right.
Dietrich v The Queen (1992):  an accused is entitled to publicly funded legal representation where that is necessary to a fair trial (Mason among the majority).
Minister for Immigration and Ethnic Affairs v Teoh (1995): the high point in Australia of the idea of "legitimate expectation", which Mason favoured although in this and other cases other members of the Court criticised it for illogicality and fictionality.  The decision provoked formal ministerial objections, but bills to reverse the precedent failed three times with the calling of a general election.  The Court has since considerably reduced the scope of the idea.

After retiring from the High Court, in 1997 Mason was appointed one of the Non-Permanent Judges of the Hong Kong Court of Final Appeal, a position that he held until 2015. He was also President of the Court of Appeal of the Solomon Islands and was a judge on the Supreme Court of Fiji.

In addition to those judicial roles, from 1994 to 1999 Mason served as Chancellor of the University of New South Wales. From 1996 to 1997, he was a professor of legal science at the University of Cambridge and served as Chairman of the Council of National Library of Australia in 1997–1998. He is also a visiting fellow at the Faculty of Law at the Australian National University.

Role in the Dismissal

On 11 November 1975, Governor-General Sir John Kerr summoned Prime Minister Gough Whitlam to his residence and, without warning, handed him a letter dismissing him, together with his ministers, from office. Kerr's 1978 autobiography mentions that he had discussed this possibility with Mason but gives no detail.

In 2012, statements in some of Kerr's papers, released by the National Archives, following a request by Professor Jenny Hocking were given publicity in her biography, Gough Whitlam: His Time. Kerr confirms that in 1975 Mason had advised him on whether the Constitution allows a Governor-General to dismiss a Prime Minister who is unable to obtain supply. Kerr claims that Mason, as well as Chief Justice Sir Garfield Barwick, had advised him that there is such power and that he had followed that advice.

In response, on 27 August 2012 Mason published his own account in major newspapers.

Mason's account challenges the accuracy and completeness of Kerr's account in several respects, but most importantly on his advice regarding power to dismiss a Prime Minister.  He confirms that as early as August 1975 he had advised Kerr, as a "close friend", that the Governor-General does have such power.  He confirms, as Kerr's autobiography had stated although Kerr's papers give a different impression, that he had only advised Kerr on the available courses of action and had not advised him to pursue the course of dismissal.

Mason also stresses that he had warned Kerr on several occasions and as late as 9 November 1975 that the Governor-General could exercise that power only after notifying the Prime Minister that he would do so if the Prime Minister did not agree to holding a general election.  On 19 November, Mason says, he asked Kerr to ensure that his papers contained that warning, but Kerr did not do that.

However, on 11 November 1975 Kerr dismissed Whitlam summarily. Had Kerr notified Whitlam of his intention, Whitlam could have got in first by advising the Queen to dismiss Kerr.  Mason confirms that Kerr was well aware of the danger of what Kerr referred to as a "race to the Palace". Indeed, Mason says, Kerr had told him that Whitlam had once raised with him the possibility of such a situation.

Mason recounts that, in August or soon after in 1975, Kerr had been told by a member of the Prime Minister's department that Whitlam was of the view that, if Kerr were to indicate that he might dismiss Whitlam, Whitlam would advise the Queen to dismiss Kerr. Mason states that at Kerr's request on 9 November he drafted a letter dismissing Whitlam, although without consulting him further a "very different" text was used.

Mason says that he had declined to provide Kerr with written advice on his powers, particularly because it would be inappropriate for a Justice of the High Court to do so without consulting the Chief Justice. However, at Kerr's request Chief Justice Barwick did provide written advice, which was that he did have power to dismiss a Prime Minister who could not obtain supply and was unwilling to either resign or agree to a general election.

Mason states that he saw that advice and expressed broad agreement with it. He says that, when Kerr asked him whether, if the matter came to the High Court, Barwick should sit, he had said that he did not know.  He says that Kerr did not ask him what his own position would be in that event.  But he recalls that he had thought it unlikely that the matter would come to the High Court (which had also been Barwick's advice to Kerr).

Mason's statement ends:
Despite my disagreement with Sir John’s account of events and his decision not to warn the prime minister, I consider that Sir John was subjected to unjustified vilification for making the decision which he made.  I consider and have always considered that Sir John acted consistently with his duty except in so far as he had a duty to warn the prime minister of his intended action and he did not do so.

Honours
 Commander of the Order of the British Empire (CBE), 1969 Queen's Birthday Honours
 Knight Commander of the Order of the British Empire (KBE), 22 September 1972
 Companion of the Order of Australia (AC), 1988 Australia Day Honours
 Centenary Medal, 1 January 2001
 Grand Bauhinia Medal (GBM), 1 July 2013 
 Honorary doctorates in law from ANU, Deakin, Griffith, Melbourne, Monash, Sydney, Hong Kong, Oxford and UNSW universities.
 Invested as an Honorary Fellow (HonFAIB) of the Australian Institute of Building (AIB), by the Honourable Sir Peter Cosgrove AK MC( Retd) Governor General of Australia and the AIB's National President adjunct Professor Paul Heather AM FAIB FRSN November 2017 at Western Sydney University in the presence of the Chancellor Professor Peter Shergold AC FRSN.
 In 2018 elected as a Fellow of the Royal Society of New South Wales 
 In 2019 inducted as a Distinguished Fellow of the Royal Society of New South Wales 
 Elected Life Fellow of the Australian Academy of Law.

References

Further reading

External links
 Sir Gerard Brennan – A Tribute to The Hon. Sir Anthony Mason, AC KBE
 Justice Michael McHugh – The Constitutional Jurisprudence of the High Court: 1989–2004

1925 births
Living people
Chief justices of Australia
Justices of the High Court of Australia
Judges of the Supreme Court of New South Wales
Fellows of the Australian Academy of Law
Solicitors-General of Australia
Australian King's Counsel
Supreme Court of Fiji justices
Australian judges on the courts of Fiji
Australian judges on the courts of Hong Kong
Justices of the Court of Final Appeal (Hong Kong)
Australian judges on the courts of the Solomon Islands
Chancellors of the University of New South Wales
University of Sydney alumni
People educated at Sydney Grammar School
Companions of the Order of Australia
Australian Knights Commander of the Order of the British Empire
1975 Australian constitutional crisis
Royal Australian Air Force personnel of World War II
Royal Australian Air Force officers